South Turton is an unparished area in the Metropolitan Borough of Bolton, Greater Manchester, England, and includes the settlements of Bradshaw, Bromley Cross, Harwood, Dunscar, Eagley, and Egerton, and the surrounding countryside.  The area contains 28 listed buildings that are recorded in the National Heritage List for England.  Of these, two are listed at Grade II*, the middle of the three grades, and the others are at Grade II, the lowest grade.  The listed buildings include houses and associated structures, farmhouses, farm buildings, former cotton mills, a church and an isolated church tower, a former school, a railway station, and a war memorial.


Key

Buildings

Notes and references

Notes

Citations

Sources

Lists of listed buildings in Greater Manchester
Buildings and structures in the Metropolitan Borough of Bolton